R. Sarath is an Indian film director and screenwriter working primarily in the Malayalam film industry.

Career
Sarath's rendezvous with films started with Sayahnam (Twilight) in 2000.The film marked his debut as a director and script writer and he won accolades for both at the Kerala State Film Awards. Sayahnam won seven awards at the State Film Awards and also the Indira Gandhi National Award for debut director. The film was featured at the Munich International Film Festival, 2001 in the competition section and was invited to many popular international film festivals.

In his next feature film Sthithi (Plight) Sarath told the tale of a middle-class couple who face the onslaughts of fortune. The film premiered at the Bangkok International Film Festival in 2003. His third feature film Seelabathi (2006) a drama set in rural Kerala. The film received both box-office success and positive remarks from critics and featured at the Asia Pacific film festival in Taiwan.

Sarath also scripted and directed a Hindi feature film, an Indo-Chinese co-production tilted The Desire - A journey of a woman (2011).

The Desire depicts the eventful journey of an Indian classical dancer and her love for a Chinese artist who she met during a travel assignment.

In Parudeesa (2012) Sarath embraced new horizons of thought delineating the perpetual disagreement between orthodox and unorthodox paths of religion.

His film Buddhan Chirikkunnu (Buddha Smiles) pays homage to Charlie Chaplin.

During the filming of his documentary The Painted Epics, Sarath discovered some rare mural paintings of Raja Ravi Varma in Kilimanoor temple. Sarath has studied murals in detail and received a junior fellowship from the Department of Culture, Government of India in 1996, for his research on murals. He is now involved in experimental non-feature films which covers contemporary themes.

Of date there are 10 documentaries and 5 short films also to Sarath's credit.  Purani Dhun (Hindi), The Painted Epics, Divine Love, and Lasyangana mesmerised art lovers in India and abroad with its visual poetry and classic rendering. The docu-fictional Bhumikku Oru Charamagitam (A Requiem to Earth) is a short film on eco-feministic aesthetics based on the Malayalam poem of the same name by legendary poet O. N. V. Kurup.

He is currently working as Deputy Director at the Information and Public Relations Department, Government of Kerala. He previously served as the Director of MPCC and Secretary of Bharat Bhavan under the Kerala State Cultural department. Sarath also works as Visual Director in India's first multi-media project - Geet Govinda, a collaboration involving The Indira Gandhi National Centre for Arts, New Delhi and the multimedia design expertise of XEROX Palo Alto Research centre, USA. Dr Kapila Vatsyayan wrote the script for this multimedia venture in 1997. Sarath was the festival director of IUKFF 2007 in London. He also served as a jury member for the National Film Award in 2011 and was the jury Chairman of the Kerala State Television Award in 2012 and 2021.

Filmography

Feature films

Awards
 Indira Gandhi Award for Best Debut Film of a Director - Sayahnam
 Kerala State Film Award for Best Film - Sayahnam
 Kerala State Film Award for Second Best Film - Sthithi
 Kerala State Film Award for Best Short Film - Bhoomikku oru charamageetham
 Kerala State Film Award for Best Story - Sayahnam
 Award for Best Narrative Feature Film at the 2011 Geneva International Film Festival - The Desire
 Award for Best Film at the London Asian film festival - The Desire
Award for Best Director at Asia Pacific film festival, Taipei
Best Screenplay Award at the Mexican International film festival (shared with Vinu Abraham) - Parudeesa
Best Dramatic Editing Award at the Amsterdam International film festival (shared with B. Ajithkumar) - Parudeesa

References

External links
 R. Sarath at the British Film Institute Movie Database
 

Malayalam film directors
People from Kollam district
Malayali people
Living people
Year of birth missing (living people)
Malayalam screenwriters
Screenwriters from Kerala
Film directors from Kerala
21st-century Indian film directors
Director whose film won the Best Debut Feature Film National Film Award